José "Pepe" León Gómez is the three-time former chairman of Real Betis Balompié. He was born March 23, 1935, in Dos Hermanas, Seville. Pepe Leon made his fortune as an industrialist.

In January 2021, he was given to a fine and suspended sentence by a Spanish court for irregularities during his tenure.

References

External links 
 Official Website Of Real Betis Balompié S.A.D.

1935 births
Living people
People from Dos Hermanas